Zlatna is a town in Alba County, central Transylvania, Romania. It has a population of 7,490.

Administration
The town administers eighteen villages: Botești (Golddorf; Botesbánya), Budeni (Higendorf), Dealu Roatei (Rotberg), Dobrot, Dumbrava, Feneș (Wildendorf; Fenes), Galați (Galz; Ompolygalac), Izvoru Ampoiului (Gross-Ompeil; Nagyompoly), Pârău Gruiului (Gruybach), Pătrângeni (Peters; Ompolykövesd ), Pirita (Pfirth), Podu lui Paul (Pauls), Runc (Goldrücken), Ruși (Rusch), Suseni (Oberdorf), Trâmpoiele (Trempojel; Kénesd), Valea Mică (Kleinwasser) and Vâltori (Waldrücken; Vultur).

Geography
Situated in the Zlatna depression, between the Metaliferi Mountains and the Trascău Mountains, the town lies at the confluence of the Ampoi River with Valea Morilor creek.

History

A gold mining settlement has existed in the area since Roman times, when it was known as a municipium under the name of Ampellum. The name Zlatna (derived from the Slavic term for gold) was first recorded in a 1347 document. In 1387, it was awarded town status. During 1619-1620 Gabriel Bethlen, brought to Zlatna a few hundred German and Slovak settlers for mining work. Tellurium was first discovered in a Zlatna mine in 1782 by Austrian mineralogist Franz-Joseph Müller von Reichenstein. Zlatna regained its town status in 1968, after a time when it was officially a commune.

At the 2011 census, 89.59% of inhabitants were Romanians, and 4.59% Roma.

Natives
 Cornelia Emilian
 László Lukács
 Andrei Mărginean
 Virgil Popescu

Climate
Zlatna has a humid continental climate (Cfb in the Köppen climate classification).

<div style="width:70%;">

Points of interest

References 

Populated places in Alba County
Localities in Transylvania
Towns in Romania
Roman sites in Romania
Mining communities in Romania
Monotowns in Romania
Place names of Slavic origin in Romania